Ghidoni is an Italian surname. Notable people with the surname include:

Alberto Ghidoni (born 1962), Italian alpine skier
Galeazzo Ghidoni (late 16th century-early 17th century), Italian painter
Matteo Ghidoni (c. 1626–1689), Italian painter

Italian-language surnames